The 1921 New Mexico Lobos football team represented the University of New Mexico as an independent during the 1921 college football season.  In their second season under head coach Roy W. Johnson, the Lobos compiled a 2–2 record.

Tackle Frank O. Greenleaf was the team captain. Other starting players on the team included Ogle Jones (halfback/quarterback), Walter Hernandez (fullback), Thomas Calkins (quarterback/halfback), Vernon Wilfley (halfback), George White (end), Clifford Bernhardt (end), John Richard Popejoy (tackle), Max Ferguson (tackle/guard), Ralph Hernandez (guard), Kenneth Greuter (guard), and Cullen Pearce (center).

Schedule

References

New Mexico
New Mexico Lobos football seasons
New Mexico Lobos football